The FIBA Africa Championship 1980 was hosted by Morocco from March 20 to March 28, 1980.  The games were played in Rabat.  Senegal won the tournament, its fourth African Championship, by beating Cote d'Ivoire in the final.  Senegal qualified for the 1980 Summer Olympics as a result of its showing in this tournament.

Competing Nations
The following national teams competed:

Preliminary rounds

Group A

Day 1

Day 2

Day 3

Day 4

Day 5

Group B

Day 1

Day 2

Day 3

Day 4

Day 5

Knockout stage

Classification Stage

Final standings

Senegal qualified for the 1980 Summer Olympics in Moscow.

Awards

External links
 FIBA Archive

B
1980 in African basketball
B 
B
AfroBasket
March 1980 sports events in Africa